Julian Andrés Quiñones Quiñones (born 24 March 1997) is a Colombian professional footballer who plays as a forward and winger for Liga MX club Atlas.

Quiñones arrived to Tigres from Colombia to play in the under-20 squad and was the top goal scorer in the Apertura 2015 season. On 2016, he played for Venados of the Ascenso MX on loan from Tigres. In June 2016, he joined the Tigres' first team.

Honours
UANL
Liga MX: Apertura 2016, Clausura 2019
CONCACAF Champions League: 2020

Atlas
Liga MX: Apertura 2021, Clausura 2022
Campeón de Campeones: 2022

Individual
Liga MX Best XI: Clausura 2022
Liga MX Best Offensive Midfielder: 2021–22
Liga MX All-Star: 2022

References

External links
 
 

1997 births
Living people
Colombian footballers
Colombia under-20 international footballers
Sportspeople from Nariño Department
Colombian expatriate footballers
Colombian expatriate sportspeople in Mexico
Tigres UANL footballers
Liga MX players
Expatriate footballers in Mexico
Association football forwards